Stevelin Urdahl (born Stevelin Urdahl Foss, September 21, 1899 – August 14, 1967) was a Norwegian stage and screen actor.

Urdahl was born in Kristiania (now Oslo), Norway. In the 1940s and 1950s, he worked at the New Theater, and in the 1960s at the Oslo New Theater. He was also a screen actor, and he appeared in 13 films and television series between 1946 and 1966. Urdahl made his film debut in Nils R. Müller's Så møtes vi imorgen in 1946.

Urdahl is buried at Vestre Gravlund in Oslo.

Filmography

1946: Så møtes vi imorgen as the police commissioner
1946: Englandsfarere as Drømmeren
1948: Kampen om tungtvannet as a military engineer
1949: Gategutter as the police commissioner
1952: Det kunne vært deg as the taxi driver
1954: Portrettet as Anders
1957: På slaget åtte
1958: I slik en natt as an SS officer
1958: Pastor Jarman kommer hjem as a ship's officer
1959: Herren og hans tjenere
1961: Hans Nielsen Hauge as the neighbor
1964: Klokker i måneskinn as a sailor
1966: Broder Gabrielsen as Olsen

Television
1966: Lille Lord Fauntleroy as the office clerk

References

External links
 
 Stevelin Urdah at Sceneweb
 Stevelin Urdah at Filmfront
 Stevelin Urdah at the Swedish Film Database

1899 births
1967 deaths
20th-century Norwegian male actors
Male actors from Oslo